Wageningen is a community resort and an agricultural place in the Republic of Suriname and located in the coastal area of West Suriname in the Nickerie District, at the harbour of the Nickerie River across the right estuary of the Maratakka River. The town was known as the rice centre of Suriname, Wageningen has been founded in 1949 and named after the Dutch city of Wageningen.

Overview
Wageningen has the presence of large piece of fertile land, desired climate with enough rainfall and the absence of natural disasters. The Stichting Machinale Landbouw was founded on 27 July 1949 for the mechanized rice production and a town was constructed for the work force which mainly consisted of former military. The town was named Wageningen after the Dutch city, and university.

Wageningen has a police office, an administrative office and a doctor's. There is also a landing strip for small airplanes for agricultural purposes. The statue was created by George Barron and commissioned by Stichting Machinale Landbouw.

During the 1980s a period of decline started in the rice production, and in December 2010, Staatsolie announced a program of ethanol production from sugarcane. The rice factory of Stichting Machinale Landbouw which closed down, restarted its operation in 2018.

Lokono Shikuabana
Lokono Shikuabana (until 11 March 2013: Post Utrecht) is an indigenous village of the Lokono people near Wageningen on the other side of the Nickerie River. The village is located at a former police outpost called Post Utrecht. Lokono Shikuabana suffers from limited water supply, and only has electricity during the evening. As of 2022, the population is about 115 people, and the village chief is Dorothy Marius-Lambert.

Cupido
Cupido (also: Kipido;) is an indigenous village of the Lokono people. It is located on the Maratakka River about 20 kilometres from its mouth. The village is built on sand hill overlooking the river amongst swamp forests and savannas. The population as of 2022 is 26 people, and the village chief is Runaldo Daniël.

References

External links

Resorts of Suriname
Populated places in Nickerie District